Harlan County War  (2000) is a television film directed by Tony Bill and written by Peter Silverman. It aired on Showtime.

Plot
A Kentucky woman whose mine-worker husband is nearly killed in a cave-in, and whose father is slowly dying of black lung, joins the picket lines for a long, violent strike.

Principal cast
Holly Hunter as Ruby Kincaid
Stellan Skarsgård as Warren Jakopovich
Ted Levine as Silas Kincaid
Wayne Robson as Tug Jones
Alex House as Buddy Kincaid
Charlotte Arnold as Lucinda Kincaid
Ker Wells as Little Lee
Jennifer Irwin as Mary Ball
Rufus Crawford as Bill Worthington
Cliff Saunders as Lawrence Perkins
Deborah Pollitt as Ora Perkins
Tim Burd as Dillard Ball
Tom Harvey as Jerry Selvey
Reginald Doresa as Bronce Breckenridge
Helen Hughes as Aunt Melva Jones

Awards and nominations
Emmy Awards
Outstanding Actress Lead Actress in a Miniseries or Movie (Hunter, nominated)

Golden Globe Awards
Best Actress - Miniseries or Television Film (Hunter, nominated)

Satellite Awards
Best Actress – Miniseries or Television Film (Hunter, nominated)

See also
 Harlan County, USA, a documentary about the Brookside strike in 1972
 Matewan, a drama about the Matewan strike in West Virginia, in 1920

External links
 

2000 television films
2000 films
2000 drama films
American television films
Films set in Kentucky
Films about mining
Films about the labor movement
Miners' labor disputes in the United States
Labor disputes in Kentucky
Films directed by Tony Bill
Films scored by Van Dyke Parks
2000s English-language films
Harlan County, Kentucky